Fradkin is a Yiddish family name. It may refer to one of the following persons:
 Barbara Fradkin, a Canadian writer
 Eduardo Fradkin, an Argentinian-American physicist
 Efim S. Fradkin, a Soviet/Russian physicist
Judith Fradkin, American physician-scientist
 Les Fradkin, an American musician
 Lucy Fradkin, an American artist
 Mark Fradkin, a Soviet composer
 Philip L. Fradkin, an American environmentalist
 Shneur Zalman Fradkin, a Chabad rabbi
 Fradkin Brothers Furniture, a furniture retailer in Baltimore County, Maryland

Jewish surnames